Osaore Emmanuel Onariase (born 21 October 1996) is an English professional footballer who plays as a central defender for  club Dagenham & Redbridge. He is a product of the West Ham United Academy and made his senior breakthrough with spells at Cheltenham Town and Dagenham & Redbridge. Following a spell back in the English Football League with Scunthorpe United between 2020 and 2022, Onariase returned to Dagenham & Redbridge.

Career

West Ham United 
After failing a trial with Premier League club West Ham United and subsequently spending time with rival London club Millwall, Onariase re-signed for the Hammers at the age of 12. Originally a midfielder, he progressed through the academy and was developed into a central defender at U14 and U15 level. Despite only being signed to a schoolboy contract, Onariase received his maiden call into the first team squad for a Premier League match versus Arsenal on 14 March 2015 and remained an unused substitute during the 3–0 defeat. Onariase signed his first professional contract in April 2015, but elected to depart Upton Park in January 2016.

Brentford 
On 29 January 2016, Onariase signed an 18-month contract with the Development Squad at Championship club Brentford for an undisclosed fee. After good performances for the B team early in the 2016–17 season, suspension to Harlee Dean saw Onariase receive his maiden first team call up versus Derby County on 18 October 2016 and he remained an unused substitute during the 0–0 draw. Onariase was an unused substitute on two further occasions and on 1 January 2017, he joined League Two strugglers Cheltenham Town on loan until the end of the 2016–17 season. He made the first senior appearance of his career the following day with a start in a 2–0 defeat to Colchester United. Onariase scored the first senior goal of his career with a late consolation in a 2–1 defeat to Notts County on 11 February. He finished the season with 24 appearances.

After signing a new two-year contract on 22 June 2017, Onariase was included in the first team squad for its 2017–18 pre-season training camp in France. He failed to win a further first team call up before departing Griffin Park on 31 August 2017.

Rotherham United 
On 31 August 2017, Onariase joined League One club Rotherham United on a two-year contract for an undisclosed fee. After making two EFL Trophy appearances and receiving just one call into a league squad, Onariase re-joined League Two club Cheltenham Town on loan on 1 January 2018. He made just five appearances during the remainder of the 2017–18 season.

After the Millers' promotion to the Championship for the 2018–19 season, a failure to make an appearance during the first two months of the campaign saw Onariase depart the New York Stadium on loan for the remainder of the season in October 2018. He was released when his contract expired at the end of the 2018–19 season.

Dagenham & Redbridge (loan and permanent transfer) 
On 25 October 2018, Onariase joined National League club Dagenham & Redbridge on a loan which was later extended until the end of the 2018–19 season. He made 31 appearances during his spell and signed a one-year contract with the club on 4 July 2019. Onariase made 32 appearances and scored two goals during the truncated 2019–20 season. He departed the Daggers in August 2020 and made 63 appearances and scored two goals during his two spells at Victoria Road.

Scunthorpe United 
On 3 August 2020, Onariase signed a two-year contract with League Two club Scunthorpe United for an undisclosed fee. During a relegation-threatened 2020–21 season affected by hernia problems, he made 28 appearances and scored two goals. Onariase made 34 appearances and scored two goals during the 2021–22 season and departed the club in March 2022. He made 62 appearances and scored four goals during his time at Glanford Park.

Return to Dagenham & Redbridge 
On 15 March 2022, Onariase returned to National League club Dagenham & Redbridge for an undisclosed fee and signed a contract running until the end of the 2023–24 season. He made 10 appearances and scored one goal during what remained of a 2021–22 season in which the Daggers finished one place outside the playoff zone.

Personal life 
Onariase attended St Thomas the Apostle College and was head boy. He is of Nigerian descent.

Career statistics

References

External links 

 Manny Onariase at premierleague.com

1996 births
Living people
English footballers
English people of Nigerian descent
Black British sportspeople
Association football central defenders
Brentford F.C. players
West Ham United F.C. players
English Football League players
Cheltenham Town F.C. players
Dagenham & Redbridge F.C. players
Rotherham United F.C. players
National League (English football) players
Footballers from Croydon
Scunthorpe United F.C. players